Laurent Ottoz (born 10 April 1970) is an Italian hurdler. He won four medals, at senior level, at international athletics competitions.

Career
His personal best time was 13.42 seconds, achieved in August 1994 in Berlin. This is a former Italian record, which in turn belonged to his father Eddy Ottoz with 13.46 seconds. The Italian record currently belongs to Emanuele Abate with 13.28 seconds.

After this he changed event to the 400 metres hurdles. His personal best time is 48.52 seconds, and in Italy only Fabrizio Mori has run the distance faster.

In 1995, Laurent set the fastest automatically recorded time for the rarely run 200 metres low hurdles at 22.55.  While inferior to the last official world record in the race, a hand timed 21.9 by Don Styron in 1960, Ottoz bettered the previous best automatic time 22.63 held by Colin Jackson, arguably the best hurdler in the world at that time.  On 16 May 2010 the English hurdler Andy Turner set 22.30, but his record was never recognized by International federation, because was obtained in a straight race. Ottoz ran his race around a bend. IAAF still recognizes Styron as a hand timed record, Turner as the automatically timed record, both for a straight race, and Ottoz as the record holder for around a bend.

World best performance
 200 metres hurdles (bend): 22.55 (Milan, 31 May 1995) - current holder

National records
In 1994 he set a new Italian record of 110 m hs, snatching it from his father Eddy who had held it for 26 years.
 110 metres hurdles: 13.42 ( Berlin, 30 August 1994), till 23 June 2002.
 400 metres hurdles: 48.53 ( Lausanne, 5 July 1995), till 26 May 1996.

Achievements

National titles
Ottoz won thirteen individual national championships.
4 wins in the 110 metres hurdles (1990, 1991, 1992, 1994)
6 wins in the 400 metres hurdles (1995, 1997, 1998, 1999, 2001, 2002)
3 wins in the 60 metres hurdles indoor (1991, 1993, 1994)

See also
Italian all-time lists - 110 metres hurdles
Italian all-time lists - 400 metres hurdles
List of world records in athletics
Ottoz family

References

External links
 
 
 Athlete profile at All-Athletics web site

1970 births
Living people
Sportspeople from Brescia
Italian male hurdlers
Olympic athletes of Italy
Athletes (track and field) at the 1992 Summer Olympics
Athletes (track and field) at the 1996 Summer Olympics
World Athletics Championships athletes for Italy
Mediterranean Games silver medalists for Italy
Mediterranean Games bronze medalists for Italy
Athletes (track and field) at the 1997 Mediterranean Games
Athletes (track and field) at the 2001 Mediterranean Games
Athletes (track and field) at the 2005 Mediterranean Games
Mediterranean Games medalists in athletics
Athletics competitors of Fiamme Gialle